Crabwood is a common name for several plants and may refer to:

Carapa, native to the Caribbean, Central America, and South America
Gymnanthes lucida, native to Florida, the Caribbean, and Central America